Rémi Cavagna (born 10 August 1995) is a French cyclist, who currently rides for UCI WorldTeam .

Career
On 19 July 2016, UCI World Tour team  announced the signing of Cavagna for the 2017 season. In May 2018, he was named in the startlist for the 2018 Giro d'Italia. In August 2019, he was named in the startlist for the 2019 Vuelta a España. In August 2020, he was named in the startlist for the 2020 Tour de France.

Major results

2013
 3rd Overall Trophée Centre Morbihan
1st Stage 2
 3rd Time trial, UEC European Junior Road Championships
 5th Chrono Champenois Juniors
2014
 1st  Time trial, National University Championships
 2nd Time trial, National Under-23 Road Championships
 2nd Chrono des Nations Espoirs
2015
 1st  Time trial, National Under-23 Road Championships
 8th Time trial, UEC European Under-23 Road Championships
2016
 1st  Time trial, National Under-23 Road Championships
 1st  Overall Tour de Berlin
1st Stage 3a
 1st Stage 5 Volta ao Alentejo
 1st Stage 1 Circuit des Ardennes
 2nd Overall Paris–Arras Tour
1st  Young rider classification
1st Stage 3
2017
 2nd Overall Tour of Belgium
 6th Binche–Chimay–Binche
2018
 1st Dwars door West–Vlaanderen
 4th Overall Tour of Guangxi
 10th Overall Vuelta a San Juan
2019
 Vuelta a España
1st Stage 19
 Combativity award Stage 19
 1st Stage 3 Tour of California
 5th Time trial, National Road Championships
2020
 1st  Time trial, National Road Championships
 1st Classic Sud-Ardèche
 2nd  Time trial, UEC European Road Championships
 7th Time trial, UCI Road World Championships
  Combativity award Stage 19 Tour de France
  Combativity award Vuelta a España Stage 16 & Overall
2021
 1st  Road race, National Road Championships
 1st Stage 5 (ITT) Tour de Romandie
 1st Stage 6 (ITT) Tour de Pologne
 9th Time trial, UEC European Road Championships
2022
 2nd Time trial, National Road Championships
 6th Overall Tour de Pologne

Grand Tour general classification results timeline

References

External links

1995 births
Living people
French male cyclists
French Vuelta a España stage winners
Sportspeople from Clermont-Ferrand
Olympic cyclists of France
Cyclists at the 2020 Summer Olympics
Cyclists from Auvergne-Rhône-Alpes